Editis is a French group of publishing companies, subsidiary of French group Vivendi. It is the second-largest French publishing group, after Hachette Livre.

History
Editis was created in January 2004 by the regrouping of approximately 60% of the publishing assets of Vivendi, the other part remaining with Lagardère Group.

Editis was, for 4 years (until May 2008), part of Wendel, a financial investment group which had acquired it from Investima10 (a financial ad hoc structure holding Vivendi Universal Publishing assets after Lagardère's purchase in 2003). Wendel purchased this group of publishers for about €400 million plus debt, and sold it to Planeta for about €960 million, realizing a profit.

In May 2008, Editis integrated with the Planeta Group, the main Spanish-speaking publisher. In January 2019, Vivendi reacquired Editis from Planeta for €900m.

Group members

 the main subsidiaries were:
 Bordas
 CLE International
 Comptoir du Livre
 DNL
 Éditions First
 First Interactive
 Interforum
 La Découverte, formerly Éditions Maspero
 Le Cherche Midi éditeur
 Dictionnaires Le Robert
 Éditions Nathan
 Éditions Syros
 Éditions Perrin
 Place des éditeurs
 Acropole
 Éditions Belfond
 En Voyage Editions
 Hors Collection
 Le pré aux clercs
 Lonely Planet France
 Omnibus
 Presses de la Cité
 Solar
 Plon
 Presses de la Renaissance
 Retz
 Robert Laffont - NiL Éditions - Éditions Julliard - Seghers
 SEJER
 SOGEDIF
 10/18, Fleuve noir, Langues Pour Tous, Pocket, Pocket Jeunesse
 XO éditions
 Oh! Editions
 Editions Gründ
 Paraschool

References

External links
 

 
Book publishing companies of France
Companies based in Paris
French companies established in 2004
Publishing companies established in 2004
Vivendi subsidiaries
2008 mergers and acquisitions
2019 mergers and acquisitions